Spyridon-Adonis Georgiadis (born 6 November 1972), better known as Adonis Georgiadis, is a Greek right-wing populist politician, telemarketer and publisher. A former member of the Popular Orthodox Rally, he currently is the vice-president of New Democracy and serving as the Minister for Development and Investment in the Cabinet of Kyriakos Mitsotakis since 2019. 

He previously served as Deputy Minister for Development, Competitiveness and Shipping in the Cabinet of Lucas Papademos from 2011 to 2012, and Minister for Health in the Cabinet of Antonis Samaras from 2013 to 2014.

Early career
Georgiadis started working at his father's bookstore at the age of 15. He graduated with a bachelor of arts in history from the Department of History and Archaeology of the School of Philosophy of the University of Athens.

Political career
Georgiadis entered to the Popular Orthodox Rally in 2003. From December 2003 until August 2007 he served as the spokesman for the Popular Orthodox Rally. Georgiadis ran for the office of the Prefect of Athens in the 2006 elections  and on September 16, 2007, was elected a Member of the Greek parliament.  He was re-elected on October 4, 2009, for Athens Β. In November 2010 he was LAOS' candidate peripheral governor for Attica at the Municipal & Prefectural elections.

On 11 November 2011, Georgiadis was appointed Deputy Minister for Development, Competitiveness and Shipping in the coalition government of Lucas Papademos. He resigned on February 11, 2012. On February 13, he was crossed out of the parliamentary team of LAOS due to voting in favor of the Second Economic Adjustment Programme for Greece, against the party line.

On 17 February 2012 Georgiadis joined New Democracy, having first given up his parliamentary seat to LAOS. He has since been elected a Member of Parliament, representing Athens B, in the May 2012, June 2012 and January 2015 elections.

He was appointed Minister for Health from June 2013 and served until June 2014. In September 2014 Georgiadis was appointed Parliamentary Spokesman for New Democracy. In the elections of January 2015 he was elected in the 2nd district of Athens with 70.853 votes and he was reelected in the September elections.

He was one of the four candidates in the 2015–16 New Democracy leadership election. He campaigned for liberal reforms, tax cuts and cut of public spending and for an ideological battle with the Left, which he considers that it has an ideological hegemony. In the first round he got 11.40% (46,065 votes) and finished fourth out of four. In the second round he supported Kyriakos Mitsotakis, who won the elections and became new President of New Democracy. On 18 January, he was appointed as one of the two vice-presidents of the party.

Television
Georgiadis often appeared on TeleAsty news programmes, a TV channel founded and run by LAOS' leader Georgios Karatzaferis, expressing the opinions of his party. On his daily programme Ellinon Egersis (Greek Uprising; Greek: Ελλήνων Έγερσις) on TeleAsty, along with his brother Leonidas he commented on current affairs, and advertised books of mainly historical and philological interest, both from his family publishing house Ekdoseis Georgiadi and other Greek publishers. He also publishes the magazine Elliniki Agogi (Greek Upbringing; Greek: Ελληνική Αγωγή), which covers issues of national and historical interest. An organization under the same name of Elliniki Agogi runs lessons of the Ancient Greek language.

Author
Georgiadis has written Homosexuality in Ancient Greece: the Myth Collapses in which he argues that whereas homosexuality was present in Ancient Greece as in other countries, its extent and social acceptance have been inflated. In a 2015 TV show discussing his book, he claimed that "homosexuality did not exist in Ancient Greece". He had also previously written a Guide to Ancient Greek Coins.

He has also written the historical novel Theodora Phranza: or, the Fall of Constantinople. Greek journalist Tasos Kostopoulos has claimed that this book is the product of plagiarism of a 19th-century English book by John Mason Neale. Moreover, according to Kostopoulos, Georgiadis  added some characters to the English original, including Bartholomew, a Jewish advisor to the Sultan Mehmet. In the book, Bartholomew has the following dialogue with the Sultan: "You are a really valuable advisor. Had it not been for your advice, I do not know whether I would be here now, besieging Constantinople. You must really hate the Greeks, since you work so relentlessly for their destruction." To which the Jew answers: "I hate them! Nobody in the world will be happier than I when Constantinople will fall to your hands." Kostopoulos´ claims were supported by a number of Greek journalists. Georgiadis reply was that he had never hidden he had adapted a previous work.

Other activities
 European Bank for Reconstruction and Development (EBRD), Ex-Officio Member of the Board of Governors (since 2019)

Political positions
Georgiadis' speaking style might have a nuance of the more formal katharevousa.  He also advocates the use of the polytonic system for writing the Greek language; Elliniki Agogi is written in this system, which is not the prevailing practice in Greek publishing from the 1980s. Georgiadis has called for more research to investigate whether the introduction of the monotonic system was beneficial or not to the Greek culture and education. Once appointed  Deputy Minister for Development, Competitiveness and Shipping he changed the signs at his ministry to conform to the polytonic system.

Georgiadis often condemns the opinions expressed in left-wing publications such as Eleftherotypia or by left-wing politicians such as those of Syriza, with both parties having exchanged sharp-tongued criticism. He also routinely condemned the policies of the two former leading Greek parties, New Democracy and the Panhellenic Socialist Movement, which he viewed as two sides of the same coin. He has often used the term tholokoultoura (Greek: θολοκουλτούρα; hazy-culture) to group his left-wing ideological opponents:

He often states that the destruction of the Greek economy and Greek society began in 1981 with the election of Andreas Papandreou as PM and the party of PASOK. 

During the recent 2015-16 New Democracy leadership election, he accused Syriza of being "a second-time PASOK". He described himself as "liberal" in economic matters, while often stated that is necessary to break the "hegemony of the Left on the ideas" inside the Greek society. He stated "I want to be in Greece, what Nicolas Sarkozy is in France", while rejected the policies of Marine Le Pen and her euroscepticism as anti-European.

Another case of criticism to the Left from Georgiadis' side is about the educational system, and especially the universities system. According to him, the leftists dominate the Greek universities. He has many times expressed his will for the abolition of the "university asylum" (laws that forbid to the Greek police the entry to a Greek university), stating that it is only a tool for the anarchists to burn and destroy the Greek universities.

Georgiadis is in favour of putting an end to Greece's "eternal students", people who have been enrolled at university for years without graduating. However, he came under attack from Greek media when in December 2012 it became known that he had earned his degree at the age of 31.

Controversy
Georgiadis, in the past, has been accused of "troubling remarks about Jews and his public promotion of an anti-Semitic book by a pro-claimed anti-semite". Georgiadis has countered that he sells these books like other Greek bookstores, saying that he disagrees with their content. In October 2015, when he was a candidate for New Democracy, he described "my engagement with the Plevris Book of the Jews" "the biggest mistake of my political career to date," but he said he never was an anti-Semite. In January 2017, at the Holocaust memorial day, he publicly apologized for tolerating the views of people who showed disrespect to Greek Jews, for  supporting and promoting the anti-semitic book of Konstantinos Plevris “Jews: The Whole Truth” and for his friendly relations with him.
 
Regarding the Athens Polytechnic Uprising, Georgiadis has claimed that "there was no one dead inside the Polytechnic School, not a single one! The Polytechnic Uprising is the foundational political myth of the ideological domination of the Left in Greece. They got the police report of the previous day, of the same day and of the next day and whoever died in Attica of whatever reason became a victim of snipers." His statements have been criticized by the media. Syriza has called Georgiadis's claims an "ahistorical abjection".

On 16 November 2017, Georgiadis announced that he would cease working as a telemarketer. A few days earlier he came under intense criticism after it was revealed that the healing effects supposedly provided by the nanotechnological jackets that he was promoting were in fact void and based on pseudoscience. Fellow telemarketer Makis Triandafillopoulos had been previously convicted of fraud for selling exactly the same model of nano jackets following an investigation by the Greek consumer protection agency.

On February 1, 2021, Georgiadis mocked the move of the restaurant businessmen to hand over the keys of their shops to the Prime Minister Kyriakos Mitsotakis who with one of the most extreme quarantines for COVID-19 in the world has banned the operation of these businesses for months. More specifically, Georgiadis told SKAI TV that any restaurant businessman can hand over the keys and his own business to him in order to operate it.

In May 2021, Georgiadis in a TV appearance supported the distinctions between Greek citizens and tourists regarding the observance of the measures against COVID-19. More specifically, Georgiadis stated that the traffic restrictions in Greece may apply after May 15, 2021, when tourism opens in the country, but that these restrictions will apply only to Greek citizens and not to tourists.

Attacks against Georgiadis' bookstore
One of the bookstores of Georgiadis publishers (Ekdoseis Georgiadi), in the Exarcheia district of Athens, has been targeted and burnt 17 times by unidentified far-leftist opponents. Georgiadis has since moved this bookstore, stating that he did so to protect the anti-riot police that was tasked to protect his business. Nonetheless, a different bookstore of the same publisher was targeted on 15 February 2007, the eighth attack against bookstores of Ekdoseis Georgiadi. In November 2012, Georgiadis closed down his bookshop.

Personal life
He is married to classical composer and reality TV celebrity Eugenia Manolidou raising a son and a daughter from her previous marriage, and two own sons named Athanasios-Perseas born 2009 and Alkaios-Anastasios, born 2014.

References

Sources

External links

  
 
 Elliniki Agogi

1972 births
Government ministers of Greece
Greek anti-communists
Greek nationalists
National liberalism
Greek MPs 2007–2009
Greek MPs 2009–2012
Greek MPs 2012 (May)
Greek MPs 2012–2014
Greek MPs 2015 (February–August)
Greek MPs 2015–2019
Greek MPs 2019–2023
Living people
National and Kapodistrian University of Athens alumni
New Democracy (Greece) politicians
Popular Orthodox Rally politicians
Critics of atheism
Politicians from Athens
Health ministers of Greece